Kerwin Ray Ellis (born April 27, 1959) is a former professional American football safety in the National Football League for the Philadelphia Eagles and the Cleveland Browns from 1981–1987.  He finished with 3 sacks, and 14 interceptions in his career.

References

1959 births
Living people
Players of American football from Canton, Ohio
American football safeties
Ohio State Buckeyes football players
Philadelphia Eagles players
Cleveland Browns players